Elliott Hayes (June 22, 1956 – February 28, 1994) was an aspiring Canadian playwright when he was killed in a car accident by a drunk driver.

Elliott Hayes was born in Stratford, Ontario to a theatrical family. He was the grandson of classical actor, George Hayes and the son of John Sullivan Hayes who was one of the original company members of the Stratford Festival.

He graduated from the Old Vic Theatre School in Bristol, and worked in Hollywood for several years before returning to Canada in 1981. He then served for many years as the literary manager, dramaturge and occasional lyricist and assistant director at the Stratford Festival.

His career was brief but produced several important works, including short stories, novels, poems and plays. His most produced work, Homeward Bound, was noted by author Margaret Atwood as "a brisk, intricate, and tightly-strung play with a lot of laughter", and by Canadian journalist Richard Ouzounian as "one of the greatest plays that anybody has written in this country in my lifetime". It was first produced at the Stratford Festival and has since been performed across Canada and the United States. In a Globe and Mail feature on Hayes published just over a month before his death entitled "Bound for success", journalist Val Ross wrote that he "is emerging as one of Canada's most successful playwrights".

The Elliott Hayes Award, which recognizes high achievement in the creation or adaptation of a work for the stage, has been awarded annually by the Literary Managers and Dramaturgs of the Americas since 1999.

Works
 Blake, 1983
 Homeward Bound, 1991
 World of Wonders (adapted from the novel by Robertson Davies), 1992
 Happily Ever After, 1993
 Hard Hearts, 1993
 Life on Mars, 1993

References

External links
 Elliott Hayes Facebook page dedicated to his life and writings

1956 births
1994 deaths
20th-century Canadian dramatists and playwrights
Writers from Ontario
Canadian gay writers
People from Stratford, Ontario
Canadian LGBT dramatists and playwrights
Dramaturges
Canadian male dramatists and playwrights
20th-century Canadian male writers
20th-century Canadian LGBT people
Gay dramatists and playwrights